The 2019 London Sevens was the penultimate event of the 2018–19 World Rugby Sevens Series and the nineteenth edition of the London Sevens. The tournament was held at Twickenham Stadium, London on 25–26 May 2019.

Format

Sixteen teams are drawn into four pools of four teams each. Each team plays all the others in their pool once. The top two teams from each pool advance to the Cup quarterfinals. The bottom two teams from each group advance to the Challenge Trophy quarterfinals.

Teams
The fifteen core teams played in the tournament, along with one invited team, 2018 Rugby Europe Sevens Grand Prix Series champion and core team for the 2019–20 season, Ireland.

Pool stages
All times in British Summer Time (UTC+01:00).

Pool A

Pool B

Pool C

Pool D

Knockout stage

13th place

Challenge Trophy

5th place

Cup

Tournament placings

Source: World Rugby

Players

Scoring leaders

Source: World Rugby

References

External links
 Tournament page
 World Rugby page

London
London Sevens
London Sevens
London Sevens
London Sevens